Horace Stanley Jones (10 June 1888 – 4 October 1967) was an Australian rules footballer who played with Collingwood in the Victorian Football League (VFL).

Notes

External links 

Horrie Jones's profile at Collingwood Forever

1888 births
1967 deaths
Australian rules footballers from Melbourne
Collingwood Football Club players
People from Prahran, Victoria